Cerdistus elegans is a species of robber flies in the subfamily Asilinae. It is found in Tunisia.

References

External links 
 
 Cerdistus elegans at insectoid.info

Asilinae
Insects described in 1888
Taxa named by Jacques-Marie-Frangile Bigot